Sir Frederick Augustus Abel, 1st Baronet  (17 July 18276 September 1902) was an English chemist who was recognised as the leading British authority on explosives. He is best known for the invention of cordite as a replacement for gunpowder in firearms.

Education
Born in London as son of Johann Leopold Abel, Abel studied chemistry at the Royal Polytechnic Institution and in 1845 became one of the original 26 students of A. W. von Hofmann at the Royal College of Chemistry (now a constituent of Imperial College London). In 1852 he was appointed lecturer in chemistry at the Royal Military Academy, Woolwich, succeeding Michael Faraday, who had held that post since 1829.

Early career
From 1854 until 1888 Abel served as ordnance chemist at the Chemical Establishment of the Royal Arsenal at Woolwich, establishing himself as the leading British authority on explosives. Three years later was appointed chemist to the War Department and chemical referee to the government. During his tenure of this office, which lasted until 1888, he carried out a large amount of work in connection with the chemistry of explosives.

Notable work
One of the most important of his investigations had to do with the manufacture of guncotton, and he developed a process, consisting essentially of reducing the nitrated cotton to fine pulp, which enabled it to be safely manufactured and at the same time yielded the product in a form that increased its usefulness. This work to an important extent prepared the way for the "smokeless powders" which came into general use towards the end of the 19th century; cordite, the type adopted by the British government in 1891, was invented jointly by him and Sir James Dewar. He and Dewar were unsuccessfully sued by Alfred Nobel over infringement of Nobel's patent for a similar explosive called ballistite, the case finally being resolved in the House of Lords in 1895. He also extensively researched the behaviour of black powder when ignited, with the Scottish physicist Sir Andrew Noble. At the request of the British government, he devised the Abel test, a means of determining the flash point of petroleum products. His first instrument, the open-test apparatus, was specified in an Act of Parliament in 1868 for officially specifying petroleum products. It was superseded in August 1879 by the much more reliable Abel close-test instrument. Under his leadership, first, guncotton was developed at Waltham Abbey Royal Gunpowder Mills, patented in 1865, then, the propellant cordite, patented in 1889. In electricity, Abel studied the construction of electrical fuses and other applications of electricity to warlike purposes.

Leadership and honours
He was elected a Fellow of the Royal Society in 1860 and received their Royal Medal in 1887. He was president of the Chemical Society (1875–77), of the Institution of Electrical Engineers (then the Society of Telegraph Engineers) (1877), of the Institute of Chemistry (1881–82) and of the Society of Chemical Industry (1883). He was also president of the Iron and Steel Institute in 1891 and was awarded the Bessemer Gold Medal in 1897 for his work on problems of steel manufacture. He was awarded the Telford Medal by the Institution of Civil Engineers in 1879.

He was made a Commander of the Order of the Bath (CB) in 1877. and knighted on 20 April 1883 
He took an important part in the work of the Inventions Exhibition (London) in 1885, and in 1887 became organizing secretary and first director of the Imperial Institute, a position he held till his death in 1902. He was Rede Lecturer and received an honorary doctorate from Cambridge University in 1888. He was upgraded Knight Commander of the Order of the Bath (KCB) on 3 February 1891, created a baronet, of Cadogan Place in the Parish of Chelsea in the County of London, on 25 May 1893 and made a Knight Grand Cross of the Royal Victorian Order (GCVO) on 8 March 1901.

Abel died at his residence in Whitehall Court, London, on 6 September 1902, aged 75, and was buried in Nunhead Cemetery, London. The baronetcy became extinct on his death.

Family
Abel married twice; first to Sarah Blanch, daughter of James Blanch, of Bristol; secondly after his first wife's death to Giulietta de La Feuillade. He left no children.

Books

Handbook of Chemistry (with C. L. Bloxam)
The Modern History of Gunpowder (1866)
Gun-cotton (1866)
On Explosive Agents (1872)
Researches in Explosives (1875)
 
Electricity applied to Explosive Purposes (1898)

He also wrote several articles in the ninth edition of the Encyclopædia Britannica.

See also
Internal ballistics

References

Attribution

Further reading

External links

 
 

1827 births
1902 deaths
19th-century British chemists
Cordite
Ballistics experts
Fellows of the Royal Society
Knights Commander of the Order of the Bath
Knights Grand Cross of the Royal Victorian Order
Presidents of the Smeatonian Society of Civil Engineers
Alumni of Imperial College London
Scientists from London
Knights Bachelor
Baronets in the Baronetage of the United Kingdom
Burials at Nunhead Cemetery
Royal Medal winners
Bessemer Gold Medal